943 Begonia  is a large, carbonaceous background asteroid, approximately  in diameter, from the outer region of the asteroid belt. The dark C-type asteroid (Ch) has a rotation period of 15.7 hours. It was named after the genus of popular houseplants, Begonia.

Orbit and classification 

Begonia is a non-family asteroid of the main belt's background population when applying the hierarchical clustering method to its proper orbital elements. It orbits the Sun in the outer asteroid belt at a distance of 2.5–3.8 AU once every 5 years and 6 months (2,010 days; semi-major axis of 3.12 AU). Its orbit has an eccentricity of 0.21 and an inclination of 12° with respect to the ecliptic. The body's observation arc begins at Heidelberg Observatory on 21 October 1920, the night after its official discovery observation.

Naming 

This minor planet was named after the genus of tropical herbs, Begonia. These flowering plants belongs to the Begoniaceae family and are popular houseplants, widely cultivated as ornamentals. The  was mentioned in The Names of the Minor Planets by Paul Herget in 1955. Only a minority of minor planets are named after plants.

Reinmuth's flowers 

Due to his many discoveries, Karl Reinmuth submitted a large list of 66 newly named asteroids in the early 1930s.

Physical characteristics 

In the SDSS-based taxonomy, Begonia is a common carbonaceous C-type asteroid, while in the Tholen classification, it is a stony S-type, somewhat similar to the dark and rare T-type asteroids. Alternatively, in the Small Solar System Objects Spectroscopic Survey (S3OS2), it is classified as an X-type in the survey's Tholen-like taxonomy, and as a hydrated carbonaceous Ch-subtype in the SMASS-like taxonomic variant (Bus–Binzel) of the survey.

Rotation period 

In March 2005, a rotational lightcurve of Begonia was obtained from photometric observations by French amateur astronomers Laurent Bernasconi, Raymond Poncy and Silvano Casulli. Lightcurve analysis gave a well-defined rotation period of  hours (0.6525 days) with a brightness variation of  magnitude. An identical period of  hours with an amplitude of  magnitude was measured by their colleague René Roy in May 2011. In February 2016, Jean-Paul Godard and Frédéric Bergero also determined a period of  hours and an amplitude of  magnitude.

Diameter and albedo 

The Collaborative Asteroid Lightcurve Link adopts the results from IRAS, that is, an albedo of 0.0456 and a diameter of 69.21 km based on an absolute magnitude of 9.77.

An asteroid occultation on 25 March 2005, gave a best-fit ellipse dimension of 69.0 × 69.0 kilometers. These timed observations are taken when the asteroid passes in front of a distant star. However the quality of the measurement is poorly rated.

References

External links 
 Lightcurve Database Query (LCDB), at www.minorplanet.info
 Dictionary of Minor Planet Names, Google books
 Asteroids and comets rotation curves, CdR – Geneva Observatory, Raoul Behrend
 Discovery Circumstances: Numbered Minor Planets (1)-(5000) – Minor Planet Center
 
 

000943
Discoveries by Karl Wilhelm Reinmuth
Named minor planets
000943
19201020